Extremaduran Popular Bloc (Spanish: Bloque Popular de Extremadura, BPEx) was a communist political coalition created in Extremadura in 1981 and dissolved in 1983.

History
BPEx was founded as a coalition of several political parties and movements in Extremadura, mainly the Communist Movement, the Revolutionary Communist League, the ex-members of the Workers' Party and the Unified Communist Party of Spain. The coalition was also supported by many independents of the social movements, like feminists and anti-militarists. Originally, the coalition "inherited" the 37 town councillors of the organizations which composed it.

The 13 of February 1983 the coalition called for a counter-demonstration against a right-wing anti-autonomist (called Bloque Cacereño Anti-Estatuto), being heavily repressed by the Spanish police.

In the local elections of 1983 the BPEx gained 17 town councillors. Shortly after that, the coalition de facto dissolved, although in some towns, like Majadas de Tiétar (where they were governing), the coalition continued to exist as the Extremeñist Revolutionary Bloc.

Ideology
Ideologically they defined themselves as radical left "extremeñists revolutionaries", campaigning for an Statute of Autonomy for Extremadura.

References

Defunct communist parties in Spain
Political parties in Extremadura